Mighty Raju is a 2D animated series that focuses on 4-year-old Raju, a superhero kid, who got his super powers from the Neutrino compound. It is the first spin-off series of the popular Chhota Bheem. It is set on a fictional city named Aryanagar.

Synopsis
Raju is an intelligent boy with a strong moral code and super-human strength. As a result, he is willing to risk his own safety while trying to do good in the world, all without any expectation of reward.

Characters
Raju / Mighty Raju:
Raju is a 4-year old kid. He secretly turns into Mighty Raju when someone needs help or if someone is in danger. He wears a watch that can control his skateboard Skaty. His pet dog is Moby, who knows that Raju is Mighty Raju. In "Mighty Raju: The Movie", he received his superpowers from a compound called Neutrino, which Sandhya (while pregnant) thought of as a beverage and consumed. He is voiced by Julie Tejwani.

Sandhya:
Sandhya is Raju's mother and Swami's wife. When she consumed the compound in "Mighty Raju: The Movie", Raju got super powers. She is voiced by Jigna Bhardwaj.

Professor Swami:
Swami is a scientist and Raju's father. He made a robot named Cheeky for Raju. Due to his compound, Raju got super-human strength. He is voiced by Rajesh Kava.

Moby:
Moby is Raju's pet dog. He can talk with the help of his belt (Raju's gadget). He likes ice-cream. He knows that Raju is Mighty Raju. He is voiced by Sabina Malik.

Cheeky:
Cheeky is a female robot invented by Swami. She is Raju's caretaker and she also knows that Raju is Mighty Raju. She is voiced by Jigna Bhardwaj.

Commissioner Khanna:
He is the commissioner of Aryanagar Police. He also knows that Raju is Mighty Raju. He is also voiced by Rajesh Kava.

Julie:
Julie is Raju and Gopi's friend and classmate. She is a fan of Mighty Raju. Her little brother is Sam, who is also a fan of Mighty Raju. She is voiced by
Sabina Malik.

Gopi:
Gopi is Raju and Julie's friend and classmate. He is also a fan of Mighty Raju.

Charlie:
Charlie is a school bully and Raju, Julie, Gopi, Rosy, Mobby, Cheeky, Sonu, and Monu's rival. His sidekicks are his father and mother. He always suspects that Raju is Mighty Raju, but he can't prove it in front of his friends.

Rosy:
Rosy is Raju, Gopi and Julie's classmate and friend.

Karati:
Karati is the main villain of Aryanagar. He is an evil scientist and is known as the blue hand. He is referred to as Shakti Kapoor. He used to be Swami's science partner.

Maria:
Maria is one of Raju's friends in the movie, "Mighty Raju Rio Calling".

Louie:
Louie is also one of Raju's friends in the movie, "Mighty Raju Rio Calling". He is also his soccer teammate.

Lucas:
Lucas is boy that is a part of one of Raju's enemies' plan against Swami.

Don Pedro:
Pedro is Maria's father and top mafia in Rio de Janeiro.

Sonu and Monu:
They are Raju, Julie, Gopi, Rosy, Moby, and Cheeky's sidekicks. They assist them in competing with Charlie and his parents.

Tiya:
Tiya is Raju's cousin sister. She first appeared in the movie, "Mighty Raju: Chutti Ho Gayi". She always troubles Raju when she comes to his house because Raju broke her doll.

Mayank:
Mayank is Raju's best friend in the movie, "Mighty Raju: New superhero Mayank". He also has super powers.

Movies
Mighty Raju: The Movie
Mighty Raju: Battery Low
Mighty Raju: Aamna Saamna
Mighty Raju: Bacchon Ka Khel
Mighty Raju: Space Race
Mighty Raju: Chutti Ho Gayi
Mighty Raju: 3 Villains
Mighty Raju: Superhero School
 Mighty Raju: Hijack
 Mighty Raju: Khiladi Raju
 Mighty Raju: Time Travel
 Mighty Raju: Ice Ice Mighty
 Mighty Raju Aur Alien Dost
 Mighty Raju: Choron Ki Toli
 Mighty Ka Mighty attack
 Mighty Raju: Rio to Goa
 Mighty Raju: Japan Calling
 Mighty Raju: Most wanted
Mighty Raju: The Champion Of Alaska
Mighty Raju Ka Samudri Adventure
Mighty Raju And The Magnetors
Game Over Mighty Raju
Mighty Raju in The Great Pirate
Mighty Raju: Raju Ban Gaya Rajkumar
Mighty Raju: School Is Cool
Mighty Raju: Asli Superhero Kaun
Mighty Raju: Hello Leo
Might Raju v/s Mighty Clone
Mighty Raju And The Commandos
Mighty Raju: Aryanagar Underwater
Chak de Mighty Raju
Mighty Raju: Light Of Astrome
Mighty Raju Rio Calling (2014)

See also
List of Indian animated television series
Chhota Bheem
Arjun: Prince of Bali
Mighty Little Bheem
Green Gold Animations

References

External links 
 Mighty Raju main website

Indian children's animated action television series
Indian children's animated adventure television series
Indian children's animated comedy television series
Indian children's animated superhero television series
2015 Indian television series debuts
Superhero comedy television series
Indian television spin-offs
Pogo (TV channel) original programming
Chhota Bheem
Animated television series about children